The Mill River is a river in the U.S. states of Massachusetts and Rhode Island.

Course
The river rises at North Pond in Hopkinton, Massachusetts, near Interstate 495. From there, the river flows south into Worcester County where it forms the boundary between Upton and Milford. It continues south through Hopedale, Mendon, and Blackstone to Rhode Island, where the rivers flows through Woonsocket to its confluence with the Blackstone River.

Crossings
Below is a list of all crossings over the Mill River. The list starts at the headwaters and goes downstream.
Hopkinton
Elm Street
West Elm Street
West Main Street
Upton
Reservoir Road
East Street
Fiske Mill Road
Hopedale
West Street (MA 140)
Freedom Street
Mendon Street
Mill Street
Mendon
Hartford Avenue
Bellingham Street
Colonial Drive
Blackstone
Elm Street
Summer Street
Woonsocket
Privilege Street (RI 114)
East School Street

Tributaries
In addition to many unnamed tributaries, the following brooks also feed the Mill:
Muddy Brook
Round Meadow Brook
Hop Brook
Quick Stream

See also
List of rivers in Massachusetts
List of rivers in Rhode Island

References

Maps from the United States Geological Survey

Rivers of Middlesex County, Massachusetts
Rivers of Worcester County, Massachusetts
Rivers of Providence County, Rhode Island
Rivers of Massachusetts
Rivers of Rhode Island
Tributaries of Providence River